Patharpratima is a village and a gram panchayat within the jurisdiction of the Patharpratima police station in the Patharpratima CD block in the Kakdwip subdivision of the South 24 Parganas district in the Indian state of West Bengal.

Geography

Area overview
Kakdwip subdivision has full rural population. The entire district is situated in the Ganges Delta. The southern part of the delta has numerous channels and islands such as Henry Island, Sagar Island, Frederick Island and Fraserganj Island. The subdivision is a part of the Sundarbans settlements. A comparatively recent country-wide development is the guarding of the coastal areas by special coastal forces. The area attracts large number of tourists – Gangasagar and  Fraserganj-Bakkhali are worth mentioning. Gobardhanpur holds a  promise for the future.

Note: The map alongside presents some of the notable locations in the subdivision. All places marked in the map are linked in the larger full screen map.

Location  
  
Patharpratima is not identified as a separate place in 2011 census but it is marked in Google maps. The entire island is called Patharpratima. The map of CD block Patharpratima on page 889 in District Census Handbook for South 24 Parganas shows Pathapratima police station in Dakshin Shibganj mouza (village no. 375).

Civic administration

Police station
Patharpratima police station covers an area of 293.96 km2. It has jurisdiction over parts of Patharpratima CD block.

Transport
Patharpratima is on the Kakdwip-Gangadharpur Road.

Education
Patharpratima Mahavidyalaya, established in 2001, is affiliated with the University of Calcutta. It offers honours courses in Bengali, English, Sanskrit, history, political science, philosophy, geography, education and economics, and general courses in arts, science and commerce.

Patharpratima Anandalal Adarsha Vidyalaya is a Bengali-medium coeducational institution established in 1961. It has facilities for teaching from class V to class XII.

Healthcare
Madhabnagar Rural Hospital at Madababnagar, with 30 beds, is the major government medical facility in the Patharpratima CD block.

References

Villages in South 24 Parganas district